, formerly , is a Japanese publisher and division of Kadokawa Future Publishing based in Tokyo, Japan. It became an internal division of Kadokawa Corporation on October 1, 2013. Kadokawa publishes manga, light novels, manga anthology magazines such as Monthly Asuka and Monthly Shōnen Ace, and entertainment magazines such as Newtype. Since its founding, Kadokawa has expanded into the multimedia sector, namely in video games (as Kadokawa Games) and in live-action and animated films (as Kadokawa Pictures).

History 

Kadokawa Shoten was established on November 10, 1945, by Genyoshi Kadokawa. The company's first publication imprint, Kadokawa Bunko, was published in 1949. The company went public on April 2, 1954. In 1975, Haruki Kadokawa became the president of Kadokawa Shoten, following Genyoshi Kadokawa's death. On April 1, 2003, Kadokawa Shoten was renamed to Kadokawa Holdings, transferring the existing publishing businesses to Kadokawa Shoten. On July 1, 2006, the parent company was renamed to Kadokawa Group Holdings and in January 2007, Kadokawa Group Holdings inherited the management and integration businesses within Kadokawa Shoten. The magazine businesses was transferred to the Kadokawa Magazine Group. The video game divisions of Kadokawa Shoten, ASCII Media Works and Enterbrain were merged into Kadokawa Games. Kadokawa Shoten ceased being a kabushiki gaisha on October 1, 2013, when it was merged with eight other companies to become a brand company of Kadokawa Corporation.

Subsidiaries 
 Kadokawa Haruki Corporation: Founded in 1976 Haruki Kadokawa as a film production company. The company was later merged into Kadokawa Shoten. When Haruki Kadokawa was still on bail following his 1993 arrest, Kadokawa Haruki Corporation was established by Haruki Kadokawa on September 12, 1995, as a publisher.
 Fujimi Shobo: In 1991, Fujimi Shobo was merged into Kadokawa Shoten, but continued operations as a division of Kadokawa Shoten.
 The Television: In 1993, it was merged into Kadokawa Shoten.
 Kadokawa Media Office: In 1993, it was merged into Kadokawa Shoten.
 Kadokawa J-com media
 Kadokawa Gakugei Shuppan Publishing: Formerly Hichō Kikaku, it was renamed on April 1, 2003.
 Kadokawa Digix
 Kids Net
 Asmik Ace Entertainment: In 2006, Sumitomo Corporation purchased the 27.6% common stock of Asmik Ace from Kadokawa Shoten, and distributed the 75.3% stock of Asmik Ace into a subsidiary of Sumitomo, leaving Kadokawa Shoten a 20% stake holder. In 2007, Kadokawa's stake of Asmik Ace was transferred to Kadokawa Group Holdings. In 2010, Sumitomo purchased the remaining 20% stake from Kadokawa Group Holdings.
 Cinema Paradise
 Taiwan Animate
 Chara Ani

Magazines published 
 Altima Ace
 Asuka
 Asuka Ciel
 Ciel Tres Tres
 Comp Ace
 Comptiq
 Gundam Ace
 Kerokero Ace
 Monthly Ace Next (discontinued)
 Monthly Shōnen Ace
 Newtype
 The Sneaker (discontinued)
 Young Ace

Light novel imprints 
 Kadokawa Beans Bunko
Female focused light novel imprint.
 Kadokawa Bunko CrossLove
An erotic light novel imprint that's aimed at women.
 Kadokawa Gin no Saji Series
The fantasy novel imprint which both children and adults can enjoy.
 Kadokawa Sneaker Bunko
 Kadokawa Ruby Bunko
Boys Love focused imprint.
 Kadokawa Tsubasa Bunko

Manga titles published 
 .hack//Legend of the Twilight
 Angelic Layer
 Baka and Test
 Basquash!
 Bio Booster Armor Guyver
 Black Rock Shooter
 Brain Powerd
 Bungou Stray Dogs
 Cardfight!! Vanguard
 Chrono Crusade
 Cloverfield/Kishin (prequel to movie)
 Cowboy Bebop
 Code Geass
 Cowboy Bebop: Shooting Star
 Deadman Wonderland
 Dragon Half
 Girls Bravo
 Escaflowne The movie: Girl In Gaya
 Escaflowne: The Series
 Eureka Seven
 Hakkenden
 Haruhi Suzumiya
 Highschool of the Dead
 Hybrid Child
 In Another World with My Smartphone
 Junjo Mistake
 Junjo Romantica: Pure Romance
 Kannazuki no Miko
 Kantai Collection
 Kemono Friends
 Kerberos Panzer Cop
 Konosuba
 Legal Drug
 Love Stage!!
 Lucky Star
 Ludwig II
 Maoyū Maō Yūsha
 Marionette Generation
 Martian Successor Nadesico
 Mirai Nikki
 Miyuki-chan in Wonderland
 Multiple Personality Detective Psycho
 Neon Genesis Evangelion
 Nichijou
 Re:Zero
 Record of Lodoss War
 Rental Magica
 Romeo × Juliet
 Sekai-ichi Hatsukoi (The World's Greatest First Love)
 Sewayaki Kitsune no Senko-san
 Sgt. Frog
 Shangri-La
 Shibuya Fifteen
 Shirahime-Syo: Snow Goddess Tales
 Slayers
 Sora no Otoshimono (Heaven's Lost Property)
 Steel Angel Kurumi
 Super Lovers
 Tenchi Muyo!
 The Kurosagi Corpse Delivery Service
 The One I Love
 The Vision of Escaflowne
 Tokumei Kakarichō Tadano Hitoshi
 Toilet ga Hanako-san
 Shin Tokumei Kakarichō Tadano Hitoshi
 Trinity Blood
 X
 Yamada Taro Monogatari
 Tokyo ESP

Video games published and developed 
 Published
 Abarenbou Princess
 Buile Baku (known in Europe as Detonator) (developed by KAZe)
 Lunar: Silver Star Story Complete
 Lunar 2: Eternal Blue Complete
 Sorcerous Stabber Orphen
 Yōkai Buster: Ruka no Daibōken (known in North America as The Jetsons: Invasion of the Planet Pirates) (Developed by Sting)
 Lodoss Tou Senki (Developed by HummingBirdSoft) (Super Famicom) 1995
 Hippa Linda (known in North America as Stretch Panic and Freak Out in Europe) (Sony PlayStation 2) (Developed by Treasure Co., Ltd.) 2001
 Sora no Otoshimono Forte: Dreamy Season (Nintendo DS) 2011
 Steins;Gate (PlayStation Portable) 2011
 Lollipop Chainsaw
 Killer is Dead
 Rodea the Sky Soldier (Nintendo Wii U) and (Nintendo 3DS)

 Developed
 EbiKore+ Amagami (PlayStation Portable)
 Earth Seeker
 Sora no Otoshimono Forte: Dreamy Season (Nintendo DS) 2011
 Kantai Collection (Former) 
 Natural Doctrine
 Demon Gaze
 Killer is Dead (Microsoft Windows)

See also 
 ASCII Media Works
 Fujimi Shobo
 Light Novel Award
 Enterbrain
 Media Factory

References

External links 

  

 
Book publishing companies in Tokyo
Magazine publishing companies in Tokyo
Mass media companies based in Tokyo
Kadokawa Corporation subsidiaries
Manga distributors
Publishing companies established in 1945
Japanese companies established in 1945
Anime companies
Video game companies of Japan
Video game development companies
Video game publishers